Linet Mor Menashe (Turkish: Linet Menaşi, born 5 March 1975) is an Israeli-born Turkish-Jewish singer, best known for her performances of arabesque and pop music. She is very popular in Turkey, Israel, and the Middle East, mostly thanks to her grasp over multiple languages (specifically Turkish, Hebrew, Arabic, Greek, Spanish, and English).

Biography
Linet was born and raised in Israel. Her family had immigrated from Spain in the 15th century to the Ottoman Empire, like most Sephardic Jews, following the 1492 Alhambra decree, which exiled all Jews from Iberia.  Her mother, Leyla Özgecan (also known as Leya Bonana), was a Turkish classical music singer from Bursa. Her father, Shmuel Menashe, was a resident of Istanbul. Both of her parents are Turkish-Jews (specifically, Sephardic). She has two sisters. On 18 March 2022, Linet's mother, Leyla Özgecan, died. 

Despite reports that she had served in the Israeli Army for 3 months, Linet stated in 2021 that she had avoided serving in the military, after which she became a resident in Turkey.

Linet currently resides at Ataşehir, Istanbul.

Career
Linet started her career singing together with her mother in events when she was as young as 5, and released her first single at the age of 16. 

In 1993, she participated in the Kdam Eurovision for winning a chance to represent Israel in the Eurovision Song Contest 1993 with the song "Aniana" but was placed tenth. She released her first album in Turkey in 1995. Linet met Orhan Gencebay when she was 17 years old and released an album consisting of Gencebay's songs. She earned two gold certifications with this album. 

Linet returned to live in Israel between 1999 and 2006, where apart from recording albums in Hebrew, she opened a candy store. Besides Turkish and Hebrew, she has recorded songs in Arabic, Greek, Spanish, and English as well.

After an absence of two years in the Turkish music scene, she returned with a completely new look, performing as a guest at the İbo Show. Linet had been mentioned among the candidates to participate in the 2021 season of The X Factor Israel, which selects the Israeli representative to the Eurovision Song Contest 2022 held in Italy. She was eliminated in the quarterfinals.

In August 2021, Linet performed together with the Jerusalem Orchestra East&West at the Arabesque Festival held in the city of Akko, and also recorded Yalnız değilsin/חומות חימר ("You are not alone"/"Walls of Clay"), a song dedicated to women facing oppression around the world. The song was recorded in Arabic, Hebrew and Turkish.

Discography

Albums 
* Flags indicate the country in which the album was primarily released.
 Birlikte Söyleyelim / שירו איתנו 
 Para Para / כסף הכסף 
 Hayatın Çiçeği, Anne / פרח החיים ,אמא 
 Et Libi Koveş / את ליבי כובש 
 Linet (1995) 
 Linet'in Müzik Kutusu (1997) 
 Ölümsüz Aşk (1999) 
 אישה אחרת / Different Woman (2003)  
 Layla (2004)  
 Paylaşmak İstiyorum (2009) 
 Kalbimin Sahibi Sen (2011) 
 Yorum Farkı (2012) 
 Yorum Farkı II (2015) 
 Bilir misin? (2018) 

 Singles 
 Yatsın Yanıma (2020) 
 חומות חימר / Yalnız değilsin (2021) 
 Ne Ağladım (2022) 
 סופים מאושרים / Mutlu Sonlar'' (2022)

Music videos 

 Çocuksun Sen Daha 
 Çaresizim
 Şeytan Diyor Ki
 Ölümsüz Aşk Bu
 Kim Özler
 O Kim Oluyor
 Aşk Ordusu
 Aslan Gibiyim
 Sözümden Dönmem
 Sürünüyorum
 Şu Saniye
 Adını Sen Koy
 Resim
 İncir
 Geçer
 Aman Aman
 Kandıra Kandıra
 Hikâye
 İhtimal
 Yatsın Yanıma
 Ne Ağladım

Awards

References

External links 
 
 

Living people
1975 births
Turkish Jews
Israeli people of Turkish-Jewish descent
21st-century Turkish women singers
21st-century Israeli women singers
The X Factor contestants